Jenny Morris may refer to:
Jenny Morris (chef), South African chef
Jenn Morris (born 1972), Australian field hockey player
Jenny Morris (musician) (born 1956), New Zealand/Australian singer, songwriter
 Jenny Morris, American singer and former member of the disbanded group Innosense
 Jenny Morris (environmental health), British Environmental Health Officer